Passiflora sodiroi is a species of plant in the family Passifloraceae. It is endemic to Ecuador.

References

Flora of Ecuador
sodiroi
Near threatened plants
Taxonomy articles created by Polbot